Myriophyllum hippuroides is a species of watermilfoil known by the common name western watermilfoil. It is native to the west coast of North America, where it grows in aquatic habitat such as ponds and streams. It generally grows over a meter long, with its stem lined with whorls of fleshy green leaves divided into many narrow lobes. The leafy inflorescence is a spike of small flowers up to 12 centimeters long which grows above the water's surface.

References

External links
 Jepson Manual Treatment
 Photo gallery

hippuroides
Freshwater plants
Flora of the West Coast of the United States
Flora of British Columbia
Flora of California
Flora of Illinois
Flora of Oklahoma
Flora of Oregon
Flora of Texas
Flora of Washington (state)
Flora of Wisconsin
Flora without expected TNC conservation status